Ernestina Godoy Ramos (born January 17, 1954) is a Mexican lawyer and civil servant who has been the  since December 5, 2018. She is a founding member of the National Regeneration Movement (MORENA).

Career
Born on January 17, 1954, Ernestina Godoy Ramos graduated from the Law School of the National Autonomous University of Mexico.

She founded various civil society organizations, such as the National Association of Democratic Lawyers, Civic Alliance, and Convergence of Civil Organizations for Democracy. In 1985, she set up an office to give legal assistance to victims of the Mexico City earthquake.

She was a civil society representative in the Commission for Monitoring and Verification of the San Andrés Accords signed by the Zapatista Army of National Liberation and the government.

As a public official, Godoy was Director of Delegation Development in Iztapalapa, Coordinator of Legal Affairs in the Social Prosecutor's Office of Mexico City, and General Legal and Legislative Studies Director in the Judicial and Legal Services Council of the Federal District.

In her political career she was a local deputy in the 6th Legislature of the Mexico City Assembly and a federal deputy in the 63rd Legislature of the Mexican Congress.

On November 22, 2018, mayor Claudia Sheinbaum named Godoy as Mexico City's next Attorney General. She took office on December 5.

References

External links
 
 Profile at the Congress of Mexico

1954 births
20th-century Mexican lawyers
21st-century Mexican politicians
Living people
Members of the Chamber of Deputies (Mexico)
Members of the Congress of Mexico City
Mexican women lawyers
National Autonomous University of Mexico alumni
Morena (political party) politicians
Politicians from Mexico City
Women members of the Chamber of Deputies (Mexico)
20th-century women lawyers
Deputies of the LXIII Legislature of Mexico